Bus width may refer to:

 , the width of the road vehicle
 Bus width, in computer architecture, the amount of data that can be accessed or transmitted at a time